Sarah Busuttil (born 14 October 1991) is a sprinter competing internationally for Malta. Busuttil started her career as a footballer but later transitioned to athletics in late 2014. She competed in the  relay at the European Team Championships – 3rd League. At this event, Busuttil together with Janet Richard, Rachel Fitz and Charlotte Wingfield set the Maltese record on 21 June 2015.

Personal bests 
Outdoor

60 metres – 7.84 (Marsa, 4 February 2018)
100 metres – 11.91 (Marsa, 10 July 2021)
200 metres – 24.58 (Marsa, 11 July 2021)
300 metres – 40.99 (Marsa, 5 May 2018)
400 metres – 59.81 (Marsa, 6 April 2019)

References

1991 births
Living people
Maltese female sprinters
People from Kirkop
European Games competitors for Malta
Athletes (track and field) at the 2015 European Games